Adolph "Dolph" Frederik van der Scheer (18 April 1909 – 31 August 1966) was a Dutch speed skater who competed in the 1936 Winter Olympics. He was born in Zutphen. In 1936 he finished ninth in the 1500 metres event, tenth in the 5000 metres competition, 14th in the 500 metres event, and 16th in the 10000 metres competition.

External links
 
 Speed skating 1936 

1909 births
1966 deaths
Dutch male speed skaters
Olympic speed skaters of the Netherlands
Speed skaters at the 1936 Winter Olympics
People from Zutphen
Sportspeople from Gelderland
World Allround Speed Skating Championships medalists